Šared (formerly San Giacomo) is a village in the Municipality of Izola in the Littoral region of Slovenia.

Church
The local church, built outside the settlement, is dedicated to Saint James. The church was damaged after the Second World War and abandoned. It was renovated in 2003.

References

External links
Šared on Geopedia

Populated places in the Municipality of Izola